Elections to Hinckley and Bosworth Council were held on 6 May 1999 The whole council was up for election. The council stayed under no overall control.

Election result

References

1999
1999 English local elections
1990s in Leicestershire